The Spanish Jade may refer to:

 The Spanish Jade (1922 film), 922 British silent drama film
 The Spanish Jade (1915 film), 1915 American drama silent film